The Western League of 1939–1941 was a low-level American circuit in Minor League Baseball. The Class D level league was born when the Nebraska State League changed its identity after the  season. It is not related to the Class A level Western League of 1900–1937 and 1947–1958, a higher-level league that suspended operations during the latter years of the Great Depression through World War II.

The 1939–1941 Western League included teams based in Nebraska, South Dakota, Colorado, Iowa, Minnesota and Wyoming. The Nebraska State League was revived as a Class D circuit from 1956 to 1959.

Member clubs

 Cheyenne Indians
 Denver Bears
 Lincoln Links
 Mitchell Kernels
 Norfolk Elks
 Norfolk Yankees

 Pueblo Rollers (Champions, 1941)
 Sioux City Cowboys
 Sioux City Soos (Champions, 1939)
 Sioux Falls Canaries (Champions, 1940)
 Worthington Cardinals

References
 Johnson, Lloyd, and Wolff, Miles, ed., The Encyclopedia of Minor League Baseball, 3rd edition. Durham, N.C.: Baseball America, 2007.

Defunct minor baseball leagues in the United States
Defunct professional sports leagues in the United States
Baseball leagues in Colorado
Baseball leagues in Wyoming
Baseball leagues in Minnesota
Baseball leagues in Iowa
Baseball leagues in South Dakota
Baseball leagues in Nebraska
Sports leagues established in 1939
Sports leagues disestablished in 1941